Muela (full name Manufacturas Muela) is a Spanish knife manufacturer  based in Ciudad Real  with an annual output of about 350 000 pieces a year. The products include hunting, combat, luxury, outdoor and folding knives and knife accessories.

History
The company was founded by Eladio Muela who celebrated, in 2002, 50 years since he created his first knife, a folding model.

Materials
Most Muela knives are made of stainless steel alloys with vanadium, chromium and molybdenum content; few luxury items are made of pattern welded steel.

References

External links
 www.muela.eu
 Third Party link about company

Knife manufacturing companies
Companies based in Castilla–La Mancha
Manufacturing companies established in 1952
Spanish brands
Spanish companies established in 1952